Jules-Amédée Barbey d'Aurevilly (2 November 1808 – 23 April 1889) was a French novelist, poet, short story writer, and literary critic. He specialised in mystery tales that explored hidden motivation and hinted at evil without being explicitly concerned with anything supernatural. He had a decisive influence on writers such as Auguste Villiers de l'Isle-Adam, Henry James, Leon Bloy, and Marcel Proust.

Biography
Jules-Amédée Barbey — the d'Aurevilly was a later inheritance from a childless uncle — was born at Saint-Sauveur-le-Vicomte, Manche in Lower Normandy. In 1827 he went to the Collège Stanislas de Paris. After getting his baccalauréat in 1829, he went to Caen University to study law, taking his degree three years later. As a young man, he was a liberal and an atheist, and his early writings present religion as something that meddles in human affairs only to complicate and pervert matters. In the early 1840s, however, he began to frequent the Catholic and legitimist salon of Baroness Amaury de Maistre, niece of Joseph de Maistre. In 1846 he converted to Roman Catholicism.

His greatest successes as a literary writer date from 1852 onwards, when he became an influential literary critic at the Bonapartist paper Le Pays, helping to rehabilitate Balzac and effectually promoting Stendhal, Flaubert, and Baudelaire. Paul Bourget describes Barbey as an idealist, who sought and found in his work a refuge from the uncongenial ordinary world. Jules Lemaître, a less sympathetic critic, thought the extraordinary crimes of his heroes and heroines, his reactionary opinions, his dandyism and snobbery were a caricature of Byronism.

Beloved of fin-de-siècle decadents, Barbey d'Aurevilly remains an example of the extremes of late romanticism. Barbey d'Aurevilly held strong Catholic opinions, yet wrote about risqué subjects, a contradiction apparently more disturbing to the English than to the French themselves. Barbey d'Aurevilly was also known for having constructed his own persona as a dandy, adopting an aristocratic style and hinting at a mysterious past, though his parentage was provincial bourgeois nobility, and his youth comparatively uneventful. Inspired by the character and ambience of Valognes, he set his works in the society of Normand aristocracy. Although he himself did not use the Norman patois, his example encouraged the revival of vernacular literature in his home region.

Jules-Amédée Barbey d'Aurevilly died in Paris and was buried in the cimetière du Montparnasse. During 1926 his remains were transferred to the churchyard in Saint-Sauveur-le-Vicomte.

Works

Fiction
 Le Cachet d’Onyx (1831).
 Léa (1832).
 L'Amour Impossible (1841).
 La Bague d’Annibal (1842).
 Une vieille maîtresse (A Former Mistress, 1851)
 L'Ensorcelée (The Bewitched, 1852; an episode of the royalist rising among the Norman peasants against the first republic).
 Le Chevalier Des Touches (1863)
 Un Prêtre Marié (1864)
 Les Diaboliques (The She-Devils, 1874; a collection of short stories, each of which relates a tale of a woman who commits an act of violence or revenge, or other crime).
 Une Histoire sans Nom (The Story Without a Name, 1882).
 Ce qui ne Meurt Pas (What Never Dies, 1884).

Essays and criticism
 Á Rebours (1884), in Le Constitutionnel, 28 July 1884. (An English translation can be found in the appendix of On Huysmans' Tomb: Critical reviews of J.-K. Huysmans and À Rebours, En Rade, and Là-Bas. Portland, OR: Sunny Lou Publishing, 2021).
 Du Dandysme et de Georges Brummel (The Anatomy of Dandyism, 1845).
 Les Prophètes du Passé (1851).
 Les Oeuvres et les Hommes (1860–1909).
 Les Quarante Médaillons de l'Académie (1864).
 Les Ridicules du Temps (1883).
 Pensées Détachées (1889). 
 Fragments sur les Femmes (1889).
 Polémiques d'hier (1889).
 Dernières Polémiques (1891).
 Goethe et Diderot (1913).
 L'Europe des Écrivains (2000).
 Le Traité de la Princesse ou la Princesse Maltraitée (2012).

Poetry
 Ode aux Héros des Thermopyles (1825).
 Poussières (1854).
 Amaïdée (1889).
 Rythmes Oubliés (1897).

Translated into English
 The Story without a Name. New York: Belford and Co. (1891, translated by Edgar Saltus).
 The Story without a Name. New York: Brentano's (1919).
 Of Dandyism and of George Brummell. London: J.M. Dent (1897, translated by Douglas Ainslie).
 Dandyism. New York: PAJ Publications (1988).
 Weird Women: Being a Literal Translation of "Les Diaboliques". London and Paris: Lutetian Bibliophiles' Society (2 vols., 1900).
 The Diaboliques. New York: A.A. Knopf (1925, translated by Ernest Boyd).
 "Happiness in Crime." In: Shocking Tales. New York:  A.A. Wyn Publisher (1946).
 The She-devils. London: Oxford University Press (1964, translated by Jean Kimber).
 What Never Dies: A Romance. New York: A.R. Keller (1902).
 What Never Dies: A Romance. London: The Fortune Press (1933).
 Bewitched. New York and London: Harper & brothers (1928, translated by Louise Collier Willcox).

His complete works are published in two volumes of the Bibliothèque de la Pléiade.

Quotations

 "Next to the wound, what women make best is the bandage."
 "The mortal envelope of the Middle Age has disappeared, but the essential remains. Because the temporal disguise has fallen, the dupes of history and of its dates say that the Middle Age is dead. Does one die for changing his shirt?"
 "In France everybody is an aristocrat, for everybody aims to be distinguished from everybody. The red cap of the Jacobins is the red heel of the aristocrats at the other extremity, but it is the same distinctive sign. Only, as they hated each other, Jacobinism placed on its head what aristocracy placed under its foot." 
 "In the matter of literary form it is the thing poured in the vase which makes the beauty of the vase, otherwise there is nothing more than a vessel." 
 "Books must be set against books, as poisons against poisons."
 "When superior men are mistaken they are superior in that as in all else. They see more falsely than small or mediocre minds." 
 "The Orient and Greece recall to my mind the saying, so coloured and melancholic, of Richter: 'Blue is the colour of mourning in the Orient. That is why the sky of Greece is so beautiful'."  
 "Men give their measure by their admiration, and it is by their judgements that one may judge them."
 "The most beautiful destiny: to have genius and be obscure."

Gallery

See also
 Charles Baudelaire
 Joris-Karl Huysmans

Notes

References

Further reading

 Beyham-Edwards, Matilda (1911). "French Author and Publisher Barbey d’Aurévilly and Trebutien." In: French Men, Women and Books. Chicago: A.C. McClurg and Co., pp. 95–104.
 Bradley, William Aspenwall (1910). "Barbey D'Aurevilly: A French Disciple of Walter Scott," The North American Review, Vol. 192, No. 659, pp. 473–485.
 Buckley, Thomas (1985). "The Priest or the Mob: Religious Violence in Three Novels of Barbey D'Aurevilly," Modern Language Studies, Vol. 15, No. 4, pp. 245–260.
 Chartier, Armand B. (1977). Barbey d'Aurevilly. Boston: Twayne Publishers.
 Eisenberg, Davina L. (1996). The Figure of the Dandy in Barbey d'Aurevilly's "Le Bonheur dans le Crime". New York: Peter Lang.
 France, Anatole (1922). "Barbey d’Aurevilly." In: On Life and Letters. London: John Lane, the Bodley Head, pp. 37–44.
 Gosse, Edmund (1905). "Barbey d’Aurevilly." In: French Profiles. London: William Heinemann, pp. 92–107.
 Griffiths, Richard (1966). The Reactionary Revolution: the Catholic Revival in French Literature, 1870–1914. London: Constable.
 Hansson, Laura Mohr (1899). "An Author on the Mystery of Woman: Barbey d'Aurevilly." In: We Women and our Authors.  London: John Lane the Bodley Head, pp. 197–211.
 Jackson, Holbrook (1914)."The New Dandyism." In: The Eighteen Nineties. London: Grant Richards Ltd., pp. 105–116.
 Jamieson, T. John (1985). "Conservatism's Metaphysical Vision: Barbey d'Aurevilly on Joseph de Maistre," Modern Age, Vol. 29, No. 1, pp. 28–37.
 Lowrie, Joyce O. (1974). The Violent Mystique: Thematics of Retribution and Expiation in Balzac, Barbey d'Aurevilly, Bloy and Huysmans. Genève: Droz.
 Menczer, Béla (1962). "The Primacy of Imagination: From Diderot to Barbey d’Aurevilly." In: Catholic Political Thought. University of Notre Dame Press, pp. 49–57.
 Respaut, Michèle M. (1999). "The Doctor's Discourse: Emblems of Science, Sexual Fantasy, and Myth in Barbey d'Aurevilly's 'Le Bonheur dans le Crime'," The French Review, Vol. 73, No. 1, pp. 71–80.
 Rogers, B. G. (1967). The Novels and Stories of Barbey d'Aurevilly. Genève: Librairie Droz.
 Saltus, Edgar (1919). "Introduction." In: The Story without a Name. New York: Brentano's, pp. 5–23.
 Scott, Malcolm (1990). The Struggle for the Soul of the French Novel: French Catholic and Realist Novelists, 1850–1970. Washington, D.C.: Catholic University of America Press.
 Thiollet, Jean-Pierre (2006) & (2008). Barbey d'Aurevilly ou le Triomphe de l'Écriture, with texts by Bruno Bontempelli, Jean-Louis Christ, Eugen Drewermann and Denis Lensel. Paris: H & D Editions ; Carré d'Art : Barbey d'Aurevilly, Byron, Dali, Hallier, with texts by Anne-Élisabeth Blateau and François Roboth, Paris : Anagramme Ed.  
 Treherne, Philip (1912). "Barbey d'Aurevilly." In: Louis XVII and Other Papers. London: T. Fisher Unwin, pp. 133–146.  
 Turquet-Milnes, G. (1913). "Barbey d'Aurevilly." In: The Influence of Baudelaire. London: Constable and Company, Ltd., pp. 135–145.
 Whibley, Charles (1897). "Barbey d’Aurevilly," The New Review, Vol. XVI, pp. 204–212 (rpt. in The Pageantry of Life. New York: Harper & Brothers, 1900, pp. 219–236.)
 Whitridge, Arnold (1922). "Barbey d’Aurevilly," The Cornhill Magazine, New Series, Vol. LIII, pp. 49–56.

External links

 
 
  
 Works by Barbey d'Aurevilly, at Hathi Trust
 Jules-Amédée Barbey d’Aurevilly: Encyclopædia Britannica
 Jules-Amédée Barbey d’Aurevilly: Encyclopédie de L'Agora
 

1808 births
1889 deaths
People from Manche
French Roman Catholics
Converts to Roman Catholicism from atheism or agnosticism
Legitimists
French fantasy writers
French literary critics
Writers from Normandy
Roman Catholic writers
19th-century French novelists
French male novelists
19th-century French male writers
French male non-fiction writers
Collège Stanislas de Paris alumni